State Route 15 (SR 15) is a numbered state highway in Maine, United States.

Route description
SR 15 begins in the town of Stonington, at the intersection of Main Street, School Street, and West Main Street.  The route proceeds north out of Stonington and through Deer Isle en route to the mainland of Maine.  Upon leaving the islands to the south via the Deer Isle Bridge, SR 15 meets SR 175 and forms an approximately  concurrency with it.  SR 15 then splits off 175 and then joins SR 176 farther to the north.  The two routes continue into Blue Hill, where SR 15 turns northward, while 176 goes to the east.  Continuing north, Route 15 meets SR 199 in North Penobscot.  Upon reaching Orland, SR 15 meets U.S. Route 1 (US 1) and SR 3, and joins the concurrency northbound. The road sees the ends of Routes 166 and 46 before reaching the town of Bucksport.  Upon reaching the town, US 1 and SR 3 split off and SR 15 turns northward towards Bangor.

SR 15 continues towards Bangor, straddling the east side of the Penobscot River, along with US-1A to the west. SR 15 enters Brewer and follows South Main Street to an interchange with Interstate 395 (I-395) at exit 4. SR 15 leaves I-95 via exit 185 and joins Broadway heading north out of the city. SR 15 meets SR 221 at Six Mile Falls before entering Glenburn. The route intersects with SR 11 and SR 43 in Corinth, forming a  concurrency with SR 11.

SR 15 continues to the northwest, intersecting with SR 6 and SR 16 in Dover-Foxcroft, forming a lengthy concurrency. The three routes proceed due west through Guilford, intersecting SR 23 and SR 150, and then turning to the north in Abbot Village, where SR 16 splits off to the west. SR 15 ends at this intersection, while SR 6 joins US 201 en route to the Canadian border.

Local names
Within the towns connected by State Route 15, the highway also is known by various local names:
 Bangor, Maine: Broadway
 Brewer, Maine: South Main Street
 Orrington, Maine: River Road
 Bucksport, Maine: Main Street
 Monson, Maine: Main Street

History
When originally designated in 1926, SR 15 ran between Ellsworth and Greenville Junction. Between 1933 and 1934, it was extended north to Rockwood, and again, in 1940, to its current terminus in Jackman.

In 1946, the route was truncated to Blue Hill, but, in 1963, it was extended south to its current terminus in Stonington.

In 2004, SR 15 in Bangor was removed from downtown and routed along I-395 and I-95.  The old alignment through downtown became SR 15 Business (see below).

Major intersections

Auxiliary route

State Route 15 Business (abbreviated SR 15 Bus. or SR 15B) is a  business route of SR 15.  Its southern terminus is at I-395 and SR 15 in Brewer.  Its northern terminus is at I-95 and SR 15 in Bangor.

SR 15 Business was designated in 2004 after SR 15 was removed from its surface alignment in downtown Bangor and Brewer, instead being routed along I-395 and I-95 to bypass the downtown areas.

Junction list

References

015
Transportation in Piscataquis County, Maine
Transportation in Hancock County, Maine
Transportation in Penobscot County, Maine
Transportation in Somerset County, Maine